Charles Louis de Secondat, Baron de La Brède et de Montesquieu (18 January 168910 February 1755), generally referred to as simply Montesquieu, was a French judge, man of letters, historian, and political philosopher.

He is the principal source of the theory of separation of powers, which is implemented in many constitutions throughout the world. He is also known for doing more than any other author to secure the place of the word despotism in the political lexicon. His anonymously published The Spirit of Law (1748), which was received well in both Great Britain and the American colonies, influenced the Founding Fathers of the United States in drafting the U.S. Constitution.

Biography

His father, Jacques de Secondat (1654–1713), was a soldier with a long noble ancestry, including descent from Richard de la Pole, Yorkist claimant to the English crown. His mother, Marie Françoise de Pesnel (1665–1696), who died when Charles was seven, was an heiress who brought the title of Barony of La Brède to the Secondat family. His family was of Huguenot origin. After the death of his mother he was sent to the Catholic College of Juilly, a prominent school for the children of French nobility, where he remained from 1700 to 1711. His father died in 1713 and he became a ward of his uncle, the Baron de Montesquieu. He became a counselor of the Bordeaux Parlement in 1714. He showed preference for Protestantism and in 1715 he married the Protestant Jeanne de Lartigue, who eventually bore him three children. The Baron died in 1716, leaving him his fortune as well as his title, and the office of président à mortier in the Bordeaux Parlement, a post that he would hold for twelve years.

Montesquieu's early life was a time of significant governmental change. England had declared itself a constitutional monarchy in the wake of its Glorious Revolution (1688–1689), and joined with Scotland in the Union of 1707 to form the Kingdom of Great Britain. In France, the long-reigning Louis XIV died in 1715 and was succeeded by the five-year-old Louis XV. These national transformations had a great impact on Montesquieu; he would refer to them repeatedly in his work.

Montesquieu withdrew from the practice of law to devote himself to study and writing. He achieved literary success with the publication of his 1721 Persian Letters, a satire representing society as seen through the eyes of two Persian visitors to Paris, cleverly criticizing absurdities of contemporary French society. The work was an instant classic and accordingly was immediately pirated. In 1722, he went to Paris and entered court circles with the help of Duke of Berwick whom he had known when Berwick was military governor at Bordeaux. He also acquainted himself with the English politician Viscount Bolingbroke, whose political views were later incorporated into Montesquieu's analysis of English constitution. However, he was passed over for membership in the Académie Française on the technicality of his not living in Paris, and in 1726 he sold his office due to his resentment that his intellectual inferiors rose higher than him in court and received a fortune, thus reestablishing his dwindled asset. Eventually he made some concessions, including a residence in Paris, and was accepted into the Académie in January 1728.

In April 1728, with Berwick's nephew Lord Waldegrave as his traveling companion, Montesquieu embarked on a grand tour of Europe, during which he kept a journal. His travels included Austria and Hungary and a year in Italy. He went to England at the end of October 1729, in the company of Lord Chesterfield, where he became a freemason, admitted to the Horn Tavern Lodge in Westminster,. He remained in England until the spring of 1731, when he returned to La Brède. Outwardly he seemed to be settling down as a squire: he altered his park in the English fashion, made inquiries into his own genealogy, and asserted his seignorial rights. But he was continuously at work in his study, and his reflections on geography, laws and customs during his travels became the primary sources for his major works on political philosophy at this time. He next published Considerations on the Causes of the Greatness of the Romans and their Decline (1734), among his three best known books. It is considered by some scholars as a transition from Persian Letters to his master work The Spirit of Law, which was originally published anonymously in 1748 and translated into English in 1750. It quickly rose to influence political thought profoundly in Europe and America. In France, the book met with an unfriendly reception from both supporters and opponents of the regime. The Catholic Church banned The Spirit—along with many of Montesquieu's other works—in 1751 and included it on the Index of Prohibited Books. It received the highest praise from the rest of Europe, especially Britain.

Montesquieu was also highly regarded in the British colonies in North America as a champion of liberty. According to a survey of late eighteenth-century works by political scientist Donald Lutz, Montesquieu was the most frequently quoted authority on government and politics in colonial pre-revolutionary British America, cited more by the American founders than any source except for the Bible. Following the American Revolution, his work remained a powerful influence on many of the American founders, most notably James Madison of Virginia, the "Father of the Constitution". Montesquieu's philosophy that "government should be set up so that no man need be afraid of another" reminded Madison and others that a free and stable foundation for their new national government required a clearly defined and balanced separation of powers.

Montesquieu was troubled by a cataract and feared going blind. At the end of 1754 he visited Paris, with the intention of getting rid of the lease of his house there and finally retiring to La Brède. He was however soon taken ill, and died from a high fever on 10 February 1755. He was buried in the Église Saint-Sulpice, Paris, and the Revolution obliterated all trace of his remains.

Philosophy of history
Montesquieu's philosophy of history minimized the role of individual persons and events. He expounded the view in Considerations on the Causes of the Greatness of the Romans and their Decline, that each historical event was driven by a principal movement:

In discussing the transition from the Republic to the Empire, he suggested that if Caesar and Pompey had not worked to usurp the government of the Republic, other men would have risen in their place. The cause was not the ambition of Caesar or Pompey, but the ambition of man.

Political views

Montesquieu is credited as being among the progenitors, who include Herodotus and Tacitus, of anthropology—as being among the first to extend comparative methods of classification to the political forms in human societies. Indeed, the French political anthropologist Georges Balandier considered Montesquieu to be "the initiator of a scientific enterprise that for a time performed the role of cultural and social anthropology". According to social anthropologist D. F. Pocock, Montesquieu's The Spirit of Law was "the first consistent attempt to survey the varieties of human society, to classify and compare them and, within society, to study the inter-functioning of institutions." Montesquieu's political anthropology gave rise to his theories on government. When Catherine the Great wrote her Nakaz (Instruction) for the Legislative Assembly she had created to clarify the existing Russian law code, she avowed borrowing heavily from Montesquieu's Spirit of Law, although she discarded or altered portions that did not support Russia's absolutist bureaucratic monarchy.

Montesquieu's most influential work divided French society into three classes (or trias politica, a term he coined): the monarchy, the aristocracy, and the commons.  Montesquieu saw two types of governmental power existing: the sovereign and the administrative. The administrative powers were the executive, the legislative, and the judicial. These should be separate from and dependent upon each other so that the influence of any one power would not be able to exceed that of the other two, either singly or in combination. This was a radical idea because it does not follow the three Estates structure of the French Monarchy: the clergy, the aristocracy, and the people at large represented by the Estates-General, thereby erasing the last vestige of a feudalistic structure.

The theory of the separation of powers largely derives from The Spirit of Law:

Montesquieu argues that each Power should only exercise its own functions; he is quite explicit here:

If the legislative branch appoints the executive and judicial powers, as Montesquieu indicated, there will be no separation or division of its powers, since the power to appoint carries with it the power to revoke.

Likewise, there were three main forms of government, each supported by a social "principle": monarchies (free governments headed by a hereditary figure, e.g. king, queen, emperor), which rely on the principle of honor; republics (free governments headed by popularly elected leaders), which rely on the principle of virtue; and despotisms (enslaved governments headed by dictators), which rely on fear. The free governments are dependent on fragile constitutional arrangements. Montesquieu devotes four chapters of The Spirit of Law to a discussion of England, a contemporary free government, where liberty was sustained by a balance of powers. Montesquieu worried that in France the intermediate powers (i.e., the nobility) which moderated the power of the prince were being eroded. These ideas of the control of power were often used in the thinking of Maximilien Robespierre.

Montesquieu advocated reform of slavery in The Spirit of Law, specifically arguing that slavery was inherently wrong because all humans are born equal, but that it could perhaps be justified within the context of climates with intense heat, wherein laborers would feel less inclined to work voluntarily. As part of his advocacy he presented a satirical hypothetical list of arguments for slavery. In the hypothetical list, he'd ironically list pro-slavery arguments without further comment, including an argument stating that sugar would become too expensive without the free labor of slaves.

While addressing French readers of his General Theory, John Maynard Keynes described Montesquieu as "the real French equivalent of Adam Smith, the greatest of your economists, head and shoulders above the physiocrats in penetration, clear-headedness and good sense (which are the qualities an economist should have)."

Meteorological climate theory 

Another example of Montesquieu's anthropological thinking, outlined in The Spirit of Law and hinted at in Persian Letters, is his meteorological climate theory, which holds that climate may substantially influence the nature of man and his society, a theory also promoted by the French naturalist Georges-Louis Leclerc, Comte de Buffon. By placing an emphasis on environmental influences as a material condition of life, Montesquieu prefigured modern anthropology's concern with the impact of material conditions, such as available energy sources, organized production systems, and technologies, on the growth of complex socio-cultural systems.

He goes so far as to assert that certain climates are more favorable than others, the temperate climate of France being ideal. His view is that people living in very warm countries are "too hot-tempered", while those in northern countries are "icy" or "stiff". The climate of middle Europe is therefore optimal. On this point, Montesquieu may well have been influenced by a similar pronouncement in The Histories of Herodotus, where he makes a distinction between the "ideal" temperate climate of Greece as opposed to the overly cold climate of Scythia and the overly warm climate of Egypt. This was a common belief at the time, and can also be found within the medical writings of Herodotus' times, including the "On Airs, Waters, Places" of the Hippocratic corpus. One can find a similar statement in Germania by Tacitus, one of Montesquieu's favorite authors.

Philip M. Parker, in his book Physioeconomics (MIT Press, 2000), endorses Montesquieu's theory and argues that much of the economic variation between countries is explained by the physiological effect of different climates.

From a sociological perspective, Louis Althusser, in his analysis of Montesquieu's revolution in method, alluded to the seminal character of anthropology's inclusion of material factors, such as climate, in the explanation of social dynamics and political forms. Examples of certain climatic and geographical factors giving rise to increasingly complex social systems include those that were conducive to the rise of agriculture and the domestication of wild plants and animals.

List of principal works 
 Memoirs and discourses at the Academy of Bordeaux (1718–1721): including discourses on echoes, on the renal glands, on weight of bodies, on transparency of bodies and on natural history, collected with introductions and critical apparatus in volumes 8 and 9 of Œuvres complètes, Oxford and Naples, 2003–2006.
 Spicilège (Gleanings, 1715 onward)
 Lettres persanes (Persian Letters, 1721)
 Le Temple de Gnide (The Temple of Gnidos, a prose poem; 1725)
 Histoire véritable (True History, an "Oriental" tale; c. 1723–c. 1738)
 Considérations sur les causes de la grandeur des Romains et de leur décadence (Considerations on the Causes of the Greatness of the Romans and their Decline, 1734) at Gallica
 Arsace et Isménie (Arsace and Isménie, a novel; 1742)
 De l'esprit des lois ((On) The Spirit of Law, 1748) (volume 1 and volume 2 from Gallica)
 Défense de "L'Esprit des lois" (Defense of "The Spirit of Law", 1750)
 Essai sur le goût (Essay on Taste, published posthumously in 1757)
 Mes Pensées (My Thoughts, 1720–1755)

A critical edition of Montesquieu's works is being published by the Société Montesquieu. It is planned to total 22 volumes, of which (as of February 2022) all but five have appeared.

See also 

 Environmental determinism
 Liberalism
 List of abolitionist forerunners
 List of political systems in France
 List of liberal theorists
 Napoleon
 Politics of France
 Jean-Baptiste de Secondat (1716–1796), his son
 U.S. Constitution, influences

References

Notes

Sources 

Articles and chapters

 
 
 
 
  This very dated article also contains some of Saintsbury's own critical opinions of Montesquieu's works and their reception, especially L'esprit des lois.
 

Books

External links 

 A Montesquieu Dictionary, on line: " "
 
 
 
 
 Free full-text works online
 The Spirit of Laws (Volume 1) Audio book of Thomas Nugent translation
   The Spirit of Law, trans. Philip Stewart, open access.
   Persian Letters, trans. Philip Stewart, open access.
 Complete ebooks collection of Montesquieu in French.
 Lettres persanes at athena.unige.ch 
 Montesquieu, "Notes on England"
 Montesquieu in The Catholic Encyclopedia.
 Montesquieu in The Stanford Encyclopedia of Philosophy.
 Timeline of Montesquieu's Life
 "Montesquieu", Institut d'histoire des représentations et des idées dans les modernités 
 Château Saint Ahon – Historic estate once owned by Charles de Montesquieu

 
1689 births
1755 deaths
18th-century French novelists
18th-century French male writers
18th-century French philosophers
Barons of France
Contributors to the Encyclopédie (1751–1772)
Enlightenment philosophers
Fellows of the Royal Society
French Freemasons
French male novelists
French monarchists
French political writers
French Roman Catholics
Liberalism in France
Members of the Académie Française
Members of the Prussian Academy of Sciences
People from Gironde
Philosophers of history
Philosophers of law
Political philosophers